Wayne Bastrup is an American actor and musician. He is known for his portrayal of the younger version of Oscar winner J. K. Simmons’ character Detective O’Brien in the fifth installment of the Terminator film franchise, Terminator Genisys. Bastrup also appears in the critically acclaimed 2014 American biographical film Love and Mercy, directed by Bill Pohlad, about musician and songwriter Brian Wilson of The Beach Boys. He has performed as a guest-star on numerous television shows, including The Mentalist, CSI: NY, Leverage, Awake, Whitney, Angie Tribeca, L.A.'s Finest and the Apple TV series Truth Be Told.

In October 2015 it was announced that Bastrup was joining the cast of Sully, an upcoming American biographical drama film directed by Clint Eastwood, based on the autobiography Highest Duty by Chesley "Sully" Sullenberger.

Bastrup is also the drummer for the Seattle-based band Gunbunny.  His drumming style has been described as "driving" and "textured" with a live performance review noting his capabilities as "stellar." He was born January 20, 1976, in Port Townsend, Washington, USA. He earned a master's degree in Architecture from the University of Washington in 2002.

Filmography

References

External links
 Wayne Bastrup's Official Website
 

1976 births
21st-century American male actors
University of Washington College of Built Environments alumni
Living people
People from Port Townsend, Washington